At least three ships of the Royal Navy have borne the name HMS Usk.

  was a  launched on 25 July 1903, sold for breaking up on 29 July 1920.
  was a group two U-class submarine.  The submarine was commissioned on 11 October 1940 and reported overdue in the Mediterranean on 3 May 1941.

Royal Navy ship names